Žagrović is a village in Croatia. It is located in the Kninska Krajina area of the Dalmatian Hinterland.

Literature 
  Savezni zavod za statistiku i evidenciju FNRJ i SFRJ, popis stanovništva 1948, 1953, 1961, 1971, 1981. i 1991. godine.
 Knjiga: "Narodnosni i vjerski sastav stanovništva Hrvatske, 1880–1991: po naseljima, author: Jakov Gelo, izdavač: Državni zavod za statistiku Republike Hrvatske, 1998., ;

References

Populated places in Šibenik-Knin County
Knin
Serb communities in Croatia